Model K might refer to: 

 Ford Model K, an upscale automobile introduced in 1906 
 Model K (calculator), an early relay binary adder built in 1937
 Harley-Davidson Model K series of motorcycles introduced in 1952